The Coldstream-Homestead-Montebello community, often abbreviated to C-H-M, is a neighbourhood in northeastern Baltimore, Maryland. A portion of the neighborhood has been listed on the National Register of Historic Places as the Coldstream Homestead Montebello Historic District, recognized for the development of a more suburban style of rowhouses.

The neighborhood captures its name from the nineteenth century grandeur of Baltimore's elaborate summer estates and small country villages along radiating turnpikes from the center of the city to the outlying major towns.

History
Baltimore City College was built in the 1870s on the site of "Abbottston", a country estate of industrialist Horace Abbott. Horace Abbott was the famous owner of ironworks in the Canton waterfront of southeast Baltimore. Previously owned by Peter Cooper, these ironworks are where iron plate was rolled for the revolutionary U.S.S. Monitor ironclad ship in the American Civil War. Later the estate passed to Abbott's daughter and son-in-law, of the Gilman family, at Johns Hopkins University and was known as the Gilman-Cate estate until its razing in 1924. Abbottston Street and Abbottston Elementary School in the neighborhood are reminders of its memory.

In 1950, this neighborhood was rated the #1 neighborhood in the city of Baltimore. However, since the race riots, and the "white flight", this neighborhood has been notorious for a decline in income and an increase in crime, specifically blue collar crime.

Transport
The proposed Green Line subway extension would include a station here.

Location
The neighbourhood is located in northeastern Baltimore, is bounded by Harford Road on the east; Loch Raven Boulevard on the west; 25th Street on the south; and 32nd and 33rd Street on the north and includes Baltimore's scenic Lake Montebello, a holding pond for the city's Department of Public Works regional water system and the Montebello Filtration Plant (constructed 1913) to the immediate north.

Education

Baltimore City College is a magnet academic-specialized selective public high school for the humanities, liberal arts, social studies, and is also the third oldest public secondary school in America. It was founded for young men in downtown Baltimore on the former Courtland Street (now Saint Paul Place/Preston Gardens area) in 1839, and re-located to its fifth site at the present Collegiate Gothic landmark building in 1928. Nicknamed "The Castle on the Hill", Baltimore City College, which has been co-educational since 1979, is on a 39-acre campus with a 150-foot stone tower on one of the highest spots and scenic views in the city.

Located to the west across Loch Raven Boulevard is the former Eastern High School. Founded in 1844 for young women, it was built in 1938 of brick in a Tudor English Gothic Revival style. Facing the 33rd Street Boulevard, it was inspired by the garden parkway plans for Baltimore in the early 20th century of Frederick Law Olmsted, famed landscape architect of New York City's Central Park. Closed in 1984 and merged with nearby Lake Clifton High School in Clifton Park off Harford Road, the landmark Eastern building was renovated as offices by the Johns Hopkins University and Medical Institutions.

Sport and recreation
Across to the northwest is the former site of Municipal Stadium (also known as the Baltimore Stadium) built in 1921-22 for football and rebuilt in 1950 with an upper deck added as Memorial Stadium for the football Baltimore Colts and the baseball Baltimore Orioles professional teams. The Memorial Stadium was discontinued by the Colts when they moved to Indianapolis in 1984 and only briefly afterwards used by several other teams such as the Canadian Football League's Baltimore Stallions and the transferred NFL franchise Baltimore Ravens from Cleveland in 1996 to 1998 and also by the Orioles when Oriole Park at Camden Yards was built in 1992. It was razed in 2004 after much controversy, and replaced by a mixed development called Stadium Place, consisting of housing and facilities for the YMCA of Central Maryland.

These two institutions have an important impact on the neighboring C-H-M communities.

Demographics
The 2000 United States Census General Demographic Characteristics of CHM show that there are 8,750 residents of which 99% are African American. There were 3,265 housing units of which 80% were single unit-attached (rowhomes). 84.5 of all housing units were occupied with 55.9% of them being owner-occupied. Nearly 32% of the residents are enrolled in school (grades pre-k to 12) and 60% of the residents have attained a high school diploma or better. The median family income is (dollars) $27,471.

Community
Residents of C-H-M actively work to better their neighborhood through the Coldstream-Homestead-Montebello Community Corporation which meets every second Thursday at 7 p.m. on the campus of the Baltimore City College (B.C.C.), at 33rd Street and The Alameda. The C-H-M offices are located in the former Music/Industrial Shops/Power Plant annex of 1958 across the faculty upper parking lot.

Coldstream-Homestead-Montebello Community Corporation

In addition to meeting on a regular basis, holding community clean-ups and providing its residents with City government related information, the Coldstream-Homestead-Montebello community corporation also provides a variety of services and programs for its residents.  The corporation provides housing counselors for its residents, a summer film series for families, women's self-defense classes, organized walks for seniors and the coordination free services for its residents.

Coldstream-Homestead-Montebello community residents qualify for various programs including Project Lightbulb those that provide free energy saving lightbulbs, showerheads, kitchen faucets and water heater wraps.  Community residents over age 60 are able to participate in Neighborhoods for All Ages, a pilot program offering home repair, transportation, referral and case management services. The Coldstream-Homestead-Montebello community was also chosen as a Healthy Neighborhoods (Baltimore) community, thereby qualifying for home improvement loans at discounted rates.  In addition, the  Healthy Neighborhoods program co-sponsors with the Coldstream-Homestead-Montebello community corporation, events and block projects.
CHM also provides a variety of services for the youth in the area including a summer camp, chess club, summer dance, tutoring and homework assistance, a computer lab and indoor basketball.

Recurring events 
First Thursdays, Community Corporation Board Meeting
Second Thursdays at 7 pm, Community Meeting
Fourth Thursdays at 7 pm, Citizens on Patrol Walk
First and Third Fridays at 10 am, 6X Express Senior Shuttle
Second Fridays at 10 am, Senior Meeting
Fourth Fridays at 10 am, Lifelong Gathering
Every Friday during the summer (sundown), Movies in the Park

Government representation

References

External links
, including undated photo and boundary map, at Maryland Historical Trust

 
African-American history in Baltimore
Neighborhoods in Baltimore
Historic districts on the National Register of Historic Places in Baltimore
Gothic Revival architecture in Maryland
Italianate architecture in Maryland
Colonial Revival architecture in Maryland
Neoclassical architecture in Maryland